John Rigby (21 August 1942 – 13 June 2022) was an Australian swimmer. He competed in the men's 4 × 200 metre freestyle relay at the 1960 Summer Olympics.

References

External links
 

1942 births
2022 deaths
Australian male freestyle swimmers
Olympic swimmers of Australia
Swimmers at the 1960 Summer Olympics
Swimmers from Brisbane